Hiawatha Township may refer to the following townships in the United States:

 Hiawatha Township, Michigan
 Hiawatha Township, Brown County, Kansas